Tupouniua is a Tongan surname. Notable people with the surname include:

ʻAlipate Tupouniua (1915−1975), Tongan politician
Sitili Tupouniua (born 1997), New Zealand-born Tongan international rugby league footballer

Tongan-language surnames